Berner Kantonalbank / Banque cantonale bernoise is a Swiss cantonal bank which is part of the 24 cantonal banks serving Switzerland's 26 cantons.  Founded in 1834, Berner Kantonalbank in 2014 had 83 branches across the canton of Bern. As of 2018, the bank hat 1206 employees and managed and total assets of 30 589 mio CHF. Berner Kantonalbank doesn't have state guarantee of its liabilities.

Notes and references

See also 
 Cantonal bank
 List of banks in Switzerland

External links 
 

Cantonal banks
Canton of Bern
Companies listed on the SIX Swiss Exchange